°Lintner or degrees Lintner (per pound of grain) is a unit used to measure the ability of a malt to reduce starch to sugar, that is, its diastatic power. While the measurement is applicable to any amylase, in general it refers to the combined α-amylase and β-amylase used in brewing. The term is also generalized to diastatic malt extracts and separately prepared brewing enzymes. The abbreviation °L is official, but in brewing applications it may conflict with °L used for degrees Lovibond.

JECFA, the Joint FAO/WHO Expert Committee on Food Additives, defines the degree Lintner as follows:
A malt has a diastatic power of 100 °L if 0.1cc of a clear 5% infusion of the malt, acting on 100cc of a 2% starch solution at 20°C for one hour, produces sufficient reducing sugars to reduce completely 5cc of Fehling's solution.

Note that the amylases used in brewing reach their peak efficiencies around 66 °C.

Evaluation of a malt or extract is usually done by the manufacturer rather than by the end user; as a rule of thumb, the total grain bill of a mash should have a diastatic power of at least 40 °L in order to guarantee efficient conversion of all the starches in the mash to sugars.

The most active barley malts currently available have a diastatic activity of 110 - 160 °Lintner (385 - 520 °WK).

In Europe, diastatic activity is often stated in Windisch–Kolbach units (°WK). These are related approximately to °Lintner by:

.

100.0 °Lintner equals 3.014 × 10−7 katal or 18.08 enzyme units.

References

External links
 "Malt Carbohydrase", JECFA, 1971. Gives definitions and procedures for measuring diastatic activity.

Brewing
Units of catalytic activity